Ağalıq (known as Beynəlmiləl until 1999) is a village and the most populous municipality, except for the capital Dəvəçi, in the Davachi Rayon of Azerbaijan. It has a population of 2,446.

References

Populated places in Shabran District